The confused flour beetle (Tribolium confusum), a type of darkling beetle known as a flour beetle, is a common pest insect known for attacking and infesting stored flour and grain. They are one of the most common and most destructive insect pests for grain and other food products stored in silos, warehouses, grocery stores, and homes.

The "confused" in the beetle's name is due to it being confused with the red flour beetle, not because of its walking pattern.

Description
The confused flour beetle is very similar in appearance and habit to the red flour beetle, Tribolium castaneum and the destructive flour beetle, Tribolium destructor. Both the confused flour beetle and red flour beetle are small, about 3–6 mm (1/8-1/4 inch) in length, and reddish-brown in color. The primary distinguishing physical difference is the shape of their antennae: the confused flour beetle's antennae increase gradually in size and have four clubs, while the red flour beetle's antennae have only three. Additionally, red flour beetles have been known to fly short distances, while confused flour beetles do not. Tribolium destructor is much darker than either and less common.

Ecology
While confused (and red) flour beetles cannot feed on whole, undamaged grain, they are often found in large numbers in infested grains, feeding on broken grain, grain dust, and other household food items such as flour, rice, dried fruit, nuts, and beans. Both types of beetles are often found not only in infested grains, but in crevices in pantries and cabinet, as well. Damage to food is caused somewhat by the beetles' feeding, but also by their dead bodies, fecal pellets, and foul-smelling secretions. In addition to creating a foul odor, the beetles' presence encourages the growth of mold.

Confused flour beetles are a common model organism in science. Several confused flour beetles were experimental subjects on the Bion 1 spacecraft, launched in 1973.

See also
Home stored product entomology

References

Further reading
 Walter VE. 1990. 'Stored product pests'. Handbook of Pest Control (Story K, Moreland D. (eds.)). Franzak & Foster Co., Cleveland, OH. pp. 526–529.

External links
  Close-up photo on pbase.com
Tribolium species are hard to identify. Here are four species side by side. Note that several species of Tribolium may occur in the same infestation.Colpolon

Tenebrionidae
Agricultural pest insects
Storage pests
Household pest insects
Beetles described in 1863
Animal models
Stored-product pests